Ischasia exigua is a species of beetle in the family Cerambycidae. It was described by Fisher in 1947.

References

Rhinotragini
Beetles described in 1947